USS Natrona (APA-214) was a  of the US Navy in World War II. She was of the VC2-S-AP5 Victory ship design type. Natrona was named for Natrona County, Wyoming.

Construction
Natrona was laid down 30 June 1944, under Maritime Commission (MARCOM) contract , MCV hull 562, by Permanente Metals Corporation, Yard No. 2, Richmond, California; sponsored by Mrs. Anna Louise Spigler; launched 27 September 1944; and acquired and commissioned by the Navy on 8 November 1944.

Service history 
Following shakedown off Southern California, Natrona sailed for Hawaii 3 January 1945, as a unit of Transport Squadron 17. At Pearl Harbor, she debarked Marines, loaded men and equipment of the 806th Engineering Battalion, and continued her westward passage on 16 January. By 1 February, she reached Saipan, debarked her passengers and cargo, and sailed to Ulithi.

Invasion of Okinawa 

At Ulithi, Natrona took on Marine night fighters and sailed for Leyte to prepare for operation "Iceberg", the invasion of the Ryūkyūs. On 21 March, Natrona, with Marine night fighters and 77th Infantry Division men and equipment on board, departed Dulag in TG 51.1. Early on 26 March, she arrived off Kerama Retto and proceeded to area "Jig".

At 05:39, she lowered away nine wave guide boats, then moved to "Transport Area Fox" where, at 07:05, she had her first experience with Japanese kamikazes. After that air attack she moved to "Inner Transport Area George" to commence discharging her cargo of fuel and ammunition into small craft. At 19:51, she proceeded to the night retirement area. Until 30 March, Natrona continued daylight replenishment of small craft in area "George", with nightly retirements.

On 1 April, Okinawa was invaded and on 2 April, the Kerama Retto anchorage was the scene of a 13-hour battle against suicide planes, swimmers and boats. On 6 April, the anchorage was subjected to its most severe kamikaze attack, during which Natrona bagged her first unassisted kill. On 7 April, she completed unloading 77th Division cargo. The following day, she crossed to the Hagushi Beach area of Okinawa to debark the Marine night fighters and then returned to Kerama Retto to transport the C.O., General Andrew Bruce and staff of the 77th Division to the same location.

Between 14 April and 10 July, Natrona remained anchored at Kerama Retto, serving as station and receiving ship. She also acted as Fleet Post Office, Headquarters for ComDesRon 2 and ComRepDesPac, Fleet Replacement Center, Fog Oil coordinator and distributor, and subsistence center for crews of damaged and sunken ships. On 10 July, the transport shifted to Buckner Bay and, on 15 July, departed for the US, a veteran of 16 weeks and 208 air attacks in Okinawan waters.

Transport duties
Natrona arrived San Francisco 5 August. Celebrating the end of the war there, she got underway again on 20 August, on the first of two extended transpacific runs carrying replacement troops to forward areas, occupation troops to Japan and returning veterans to the United States. On 13 January 1946, she completed her second cruise at San Pedro.

Decommission 

Moving to Mare Island, she underwent inactivation overhaul, and on 29 July, decommissioned and entered the Pacific Reserve Fleet at Stockton, California.

She was transferred to the Maritime Administration (MARAD) 26 August 1958, and struck from the Navy List 1 October 1958. Natrona was laid up in the National Defense Reserve Fleet, Suisun Bay, California.

On 5 March 1975, she was sold to Nicolai Joffe Corporation, for $178,789.40, to be scrapped. She was delivered 1 April 1975.

Awards 
Natrona received one battle star for World War II service.

Notes 

Citations

Bibliography 

Online resources

External links

 

Haskell-class attack transports
Natrona County, Wyoming
World War II amphibious warfare vessels of the United States
Troop ships
Ships built in Richmond, California
1944 ships
Pacific Reserve Fleet, Stockton Group
Suisun Bay Reserve Fleet